Kırsakal is a village in the Orta District of Çankırı Province in Turkey. Its population is 84 (2021).

References

 

Villages in Orta District